Listed in order going downstream:

British Columbia:
 Headwaters to the Canada–United States border:
Canal Flats
Fairmont Hot Springs
Windermere
Invermere
Radium Hot Springs
Spillimacheen
Golden
Mica Creek
Revelstoke
Nakusp
Castlegar
Trail
Washington:
Canada–United States border to Grand Coulee Dam:
Northport
Kettle Falls
Inchelium
Grand Coulee
Coulee Dam
Grand Coulee Dam to Wenatchee:
Elmer City
Bridgeport
Brewster
Pateros
Entiat
West Wenatchee
Wenatchee
East Wenatchee
South Wenatchee
South Wenatchee to Wallula:
Rock Island
Vantage
Desert Aire
Richland
Kennewick
Pasco
Burbank
Wallula
Washington-Oregon border:
 Umatilla to The Dalles:
Umatilla, Oregon
Irrigon, Oregon
Boardman, Oregon
Roosevelt, Washington
Arlington, Oregon
Rufus, Oregon
Maryhill, Washington
Biggs Junction, Oregon
Wishram, Washington
Dallesport, Washington
The Dalles, Oregon
The Dalles to Portland:
Lyle, Washington
Rowena, Oregon
Mosier, Oregon
Bingen, Washington
White Salmon, Washington
Hood River, Oregon
Carson River Valley, Washington
Stevenson, Washington
Cascade Locks, Oregon
North Bonneville, Washington
Washougal, Washington
Camas, Washington
Vancouver, Washington
 Portland to the mouth of the Columbia:
Portland, Oregon
St. Helens, Oregon
Columbia City, Oregon
Kalama, Washington
Goble, Oregon
Prescott, Oregon
Rainier, Oregon
Longview, Washington
Cathlamet, Washington
Astoria, Oregon
Warrenton, Oregon
Chinook, Washington
Ilwaco, Washington

See also
 Columbia River
 Tributaries of the Columbia River
 Hydroelectric dams on the Columbia River

 
Columbia River cities
Columbia River cities
Columbia River cities